Cyprinion acinaces is a species of ray-finned fish in the genus Cyprinion. This species has two subspecies Cyprinion acinaces acinaces and Cyprinion acinaces hijazi, though the validity of the latter is in doubt.  If C. a. hijazi is invalid, then C. acinaces would be monotypic. The species occurs from western, central and northern Saudi Arabia to Yemen.

Footnotes 

 

acinaces
Fish described in 1977